Andres Keevallik (born 24 February 1943 in Pärnu) is an Estonian scientist in mechanics.

In 1966, he graduated from Tallinn Polytechnical Institute in computer science (cum laude). In 1974, he graduated from the university in Moscow. Since 1992, he is professor of roads' engineering.

2000-2005 and 2010–2015, he was the rector of Tallinn University of Technology.

In 2003, he was awarded with Order of the White Star, III class.

References

1943 births
Living people
Estonian engineers
Rectors of universities in Estonia
Tallinn University of Technology alumni
Academic staff of the Tallinn University of Technology
Recipients of the Order of the White Star, 3rd Class
People from Pärnu